Sarych is a headland located on the shore of the Black Sea on the Crimean peninsula.

About five kilometers from the Sarych headland is the resort town of Foros. The city of Sevastopol is located about 30 km away and Yalta about 40 km. The distance from Sarych to the Kerempe headland of the Black Sea coast of Turkey is 229 km (142 miles), making it the narrowest passage of the Black Sea.

History

Ancient
The area presently known as Sarych was first referenced as Kriou metopon or Criu metopon, which means "ram's forehead" in Greek.

Battle of Cape Sarych

On 18 November 1914, elements of the Russian and Turkish navies fought a battle off the coast of Cape Sarych. The Turkish force consisted of the German-manned battle-cruiser SMS Goeben and the light cruiser SMS Breslau. Both ships were purchased by the Ottoman Empire and renamed as Yavuz and Midilli, although they retained their German crews. The Russian force consisted of five pre-dreadnought battleships. During the fight only a few salvoes were exchanged. The ships inflicted minor damage upon each other, but the commanding German admiral Wilhelm Souchon broke off the action after Goeben took a hit in one of her 15cm casemates. Wilhelm felt the need to protect the Goeben, as the Ottoman Empire didn't provide facilities for repairing a modern ship like the Goeben.

Russia-Ukraine territorial dispute
Since August 3, 2005, a lighthouse on the headland has been occupied by the Russian Army. The Government Court in Sevastopol ruled the lighthouse needed to be returned to Ukraine, however Russian military officials said they were only subordinate to the chief of the Russian Navy. Ukrainian public activists said that Sarych was illegally occupied by the Russian Navy. As a military object, the territory around the Sarych headland is closed to trespassers with barbed wire with the Russian flag flying above Sarych. The issue has since become a part of the broader 2014 Crimean crisis.

References

External links
 Photographs of Sarych  

 
 

Headlands of Crimea
Headlands of Ukraine
Russia–Ukraine border